Norton-in-Hales railway station was a station on the North Staffordshire Railway between Stoke-on-Trent and Market Drayton. The station was opened in 1870 and was closed in 1956. The station building and trackbed is now a private residence including the station masters house.

References

Further reading

Railway stations in Great Britain opened in 1870
Railway stations in Great Britain closed in 1956
Disused railway stations in Shropshire
Former North Staffordshire Railway stations